Kushkulevo (Quşkül) is a rural locality (a village) in Baygildinsky Selsoviet, Nurimanovsky District, Bashkortostan, Russia. The population was 62 as of 2010. There are 2 streets.

Geography 
Kushkulevo is located 37 km south of Krasnaya Gorka (the district's administrative centre) by road. Sargayazovo is the nearest rural locality.

References 

Rural localities in Nurimanovsky District